

Raa of the Caves

Holden Radcliffe

Radioactive Man

Chen Lu

Igor Stancheck

Radius

Irani Rael

Irani Rael is a fictional alien in Marvel Comics. The character, created by Dan Abnett, Andy Lanning, Wellinton Alves and Geraldo Borges, first appeared in Nova (vol. 4) #18 (December 2008).

Irani Rael is a Rigellian who was recruited into the Nova Corps after it was destroyed by the Annihilation Wave. She was chosen by the Xandarian Worldmind to become a Nova Centurion alongside new recruits Qubit, Malik, Tarcel, Morrow and Fraktur. Rael and her new comrades arrive on Earth to aid Nova Prime Richard Rider and his brother, Robbie who had also become a new recruit.

She has since fought alongside the rest of the Nova Corps on Earth against such threats as the Serpent Society and Dragon Man. She aided in fighting the Imperial Guard and Emperor Vulcan where many of her comrades were killed. After fighting Ego the Living Planet, it became apparent to Rider that the new recruits did not have proper training, resulting in Rael and several others agreeing to be demoted. Rael became a Nova Millennian.

Irani Rael in other media
 Irani Rael appears in Guardians of the Galaxy, portrayed by Glenn Close. This version of the character is a Nova Prime from Xandar and even though her character was confirmed as Irani Rael, the marketing and end credits list her as simply Nova Prime. Rael is seen leading the Nova Corps' effort in finding and imprisoning Ronan the Accuser even contacting the Kree to at least condemn his actions. She is later confronted by Rhomann Dey when he informs her that the Guardians of the Galaxy wish to help in defeating Ronan when he begins his attack on Xandar. After some hesitation, she agrees sending the Nova Corps out to stall Ronan's ship. In the aftermath, Rael helps Peter Quill find some clues to his ancestral background. She is last seen putting away the Power Stone in the Nova Corps' vault.
 Irani Rael was going to appear in both Avengers: Infinity War and Avengers: Endgame before being scrapped.
 Irani Rael appears in the Guardians of the Galaxy series, voiced by Tara Strong.
 Irani Rael appears as a playable character in Lego Marvel Super Heroes 2. When Kang the Conqueror attacks Xandar, she sends out a distress signal that attracts the Guardians of the Galaxy and has Xandar evacuated during the conflict.

Rage

Ragnarok

Tamara Rahn

Raiders

Raina
Raina is a fictional character that originated in the Marvel Cinematic Universe before appearing in Marvel comics. Created by Brent Fletcher, she first appeared in "Girl in the Flower Dress" on Agents of S.H.I.E.L.D. (October 22, 2013), portrayed by Ruth Negga.

She is depicted as a recruiter for Project Centipede. In Season Two, she is revealed to be an Inhuman, and develops a thorn-covered body and dream-based precognition. She is rescued from S.H.I.E.L.D. by Gordon and brought to Afterlife. During Daisy Johnson's time there, Raina was killed by Jiaying in front of Daisy where it helped Raina prove to her that Jiaying has dangerous plans for the humans.

Raina in comics
Raina made her comic book debut in Inhuman Annual #1 (July 2015) from Charles Soule and Ryan Stegman. When Gordon Nobili became Lineage, he used the Inhuman Codex to speak telepathically to every Inhuman in the world. Raina is seen in a coffee shop in her usual flower dress when she hears Lineage's voice.

Raina in other media
Raina was a non-playable character in Marvel: Future Fight and appeared as a boss in the tenth chapter of the old story mode.

Rajah
Kabir Mahadevu is an elephant trainer and rider from India. He first performed with the Circus of Crime during a stay of theirs in Europe, and later rejoined with them in the United States.

Rakkus

Rebel Ralston
Robert "Rebel" Ralston is a fictional character appearing in American comic books published by Marvel Comics. The character first appeared in Sgt. Fury and his Howling Commandos #1 (May 1963), and was created by Stan Lee, Jack Kirby and Dick Ayers. 

A native of Kentucky, he was an accomplished horseman who was skilled with a lasso and a founding member of the original Howling Commandos led by Nick Fury Sr. during World War II. 

After the war, Ralston was one of the founding members of the V-Battalion, and later elected US Senator of Texas. He rejoined his old comrades, the Howling Commandos, and Captain America (but Captain Sam Sawyer was killed), and survived an assassination attempt while co-chairing the Senate Defense Committee. He has worked closely with S.H.I.E.L.D. and the Commission on Superhuman Activities.

When Fury was seemingly killed by the Punisher, Ralston and Iron Man advised the President not to attend the funeral in the event that the supervillains attack. In the form of Lt. Dallas, Omnibus placed Ralston under mental control to turn over information that can used to fund a terrorist organization called "The Alliance". When the Hulk was captured by Major Glenn Talbot, Ralston observed Bruce Banner in custody and refused to have Talbot kill Banner until the President made a decision. Robert attended a briefing on "The Alliance" with Talbot, Dum Dum Dugan, Valentina Allegra de Fontaine and Henry Peter Gyrich. The Senator and his allies continued to debate about "The Alliance", and could not determine who the group was and motive. After the Hulk had claimed responsibility for "The Alliance" in order to serve as an enemy that the people can fight back against, Thor confronted Ralston and the others in confronting the Hulk.

Robert was contacted by J. Jonah Jameson as he searched for support against Bastion and Operation: Zero Tolerance. Ralston suggested to Jameson to try Senator Robert Kelly who was more frustrated with the mutant issue.

Ralston traveled to Sudan where he met with Fury, Captain America, Sharon Carter and John Garrett at Fury's Sandbox for one last party together. Fury talked with Ralston for a moment about the support for Fury's operation that would get the U.S. Senate and the Senator only asked how soon will need those votes be needed. Robert listed to a good few stories from the past. Ralston raised his glass in a toast to the Howling Commanders' fallen members.

Robert spoke to the United Nations about the President's plans for international funds to provide economic, political, and military stabilities in areas suffering from international terrorist threats. Ralston was appointed control over the fund. The Senator picked up Jasper Sitwell and Dugan from the United Nations' prison and brought the two to his limousine waiting with Fury and Garrett already inside.

The Senator attended a weapons expo with Daisy Johnson and Nick Fury Jr., but is killed during A.I.M. Scientist Supreme's theft of the Iron Patriot armor.

Other versions of Rebel Ralston
The Ultimate Marvel version of Robert Ralston is a US Senator. He is present during a hearing with the President of the United States regarding the Winter Protocols and dies during the Maker's counterattack.

Rebel Ralston in other media
 Rebel Ralston makes a non-speaking appearance in The Avengers: Earth's Mightiest Heroes episode "Meet Captain America". This version is a member of the Howling Commandos.

Ramonda
Ramonda is a fictional character appearing in American comic books published by Marvel Comics. She is the Queen Mother of Wakanda, mother to Shuri and step-mother to T'Challa. The character, created by Don McGregor and Gene Colan, first appeared in Marvel Comics Presents #14 (March 1989).

Ramonda in other media
Ramonda appears in media set in the Marvel Cinematic Universe, portrayed by Angela Bassett. In addition to being Queen of Wakanda, she is the mother of T'Challa and Shuri. She appears in the live-action films Black Panther, Avengers: Endgame and Black Panther: Wakanda Forever, while alternate universe versions appear in the Disney+ animated series What If...?

Rampage

Ramrod

Ramrod is a foreman on an offshore oil rig. He was turned into a cyborg by corrupt attorney Kerwin J. Broderick and Moondragon, using the advanced technology of Titan. He was given a steel skeleton and superhuman strength. This steel-skulled mercenary was sent to battle heroes in San Francisco. He then teamed with Dark Messiah and Terrex in Kerwin J. Broderick's attempt to take over San Francisco. Ramrod later battled Spider-Man again. He was later among the costumed criminals who attacked the Fantastic Four during a Congressional hearing. Ramrod was also defeated in a match by Captain America, impersonating Crossbones, during an A.I.M. weapons show. Ramrod has superhuman strength, stamina, and durability. He possesses a steel skeleton; various visible portions of his body are also plated with steel, including his head (except for his face and ears), the upper part of his chest and back, parts of his arms, and his knuckles. Ramrod is a good hand-to-hand combatant, using street fighting methods.

Ramshot
Samuel Caulkin aka Ramshot is a member of an armored group of vigilantes dubbed The Jury. Caulkin was recruited into the Jury by General Orwell Taylor to help him avenge the death of his youngest son Hugh. Samuel and Hugh were close friends from their time in the army. Soon after Hugh left the army he became a Guardsman at the Vault a prison for super powered criminals. Not long after Hugh was murdered by Venom during his escape. Ramshot has a suit of armor that allows him to fly. He also emits a sonic type blast he calls a battering pulse.

Rancor 
Rancor is a mutant from an alternate future. The character, created by Jim Valentino, first appeared in Guardians of the Galaxy #8 (January 1991) as the leader of a world settled by mutants of the alternate timeline/reality Marvel Comics designated as Earth-691. Within the context of the stories, Rancor is the leader of New Haven and claims to be a direct descendant of Wolverine. She initially crosses paths with the Guardians of the Galaxy when she is trying to eliminate the Resistance. She later steals one of Wolverine's claws from a Shi'ar museum as part of a plan to find her ancestor. In the course of her quest, she loses possession of the claw during a confrontation with Talon. She regains the claw when she is recruited by Doctor Doom. She eventually turns against Doom and discovers he is in possession of Wolverine's skeleton. The confrontation results in her being severely wounded and rescued by the Guardians of the Galaxy.

Random

Ransak the Reject
Ransak the Reject was created by Jack Kirby, and first appeared in Eternals #8 (February 1977). Ransak is a member of the race known as the Deviants. He is the son of Maelstrom (whose father, Phaeder, was an Inhuman) and Medula. He is shunned and feared by other Deviants because he is not subject to the deformity of their race, his humanlike (or Eternal-like) appearance seeming freakish to them. An outcast, he funneled his rage at his rejection into becoming an expert killer fighting in the gladiatorial arenas that became his home. Ransak has superhuman strength and durability sufficient to battle an Eternal in personal combat. He has a lifetime's experience in gladiatorial combat, and is thus a formidable fighter. He is prone to berserker-like rages during which he can ignore painful injuries and attacks.

Kavita Rao

Monica Rappaccini

Raptor

Gary Wilton, Jr.
During the Civil War storyline, Raptor was among the many superhumans trying to flee out of USA and into France, but was confronted by the French superhero Le Peregrine over the Bay of Biscay, during a massive incursion tentative of refugees.

Brenda Drago
Brenda Drago was forced by her father into what was supposed to be a life of crime, as he gave her a suit equipped with functional wings (created from technology used in the costume he had worn as the second Vulture). Brenda became a flying thief known as the Raptor. But her crime spree was stopped by the combined efforts of Spider-Girl and The Buzz. In a surprising twist of fate, Raptor actually became friends with Spider-Girl. She even began to use her flight-suit as a hero, joining with Spider-Girl and Buzz in the formation of a new New Warriors. She even fell in love with Spider-Girl's friend Normie Osborn, and the two became engaged.

However, Raptor's luck went bad when she was held accountable for her previous crimes by a man named Agent Wheadon, who made Raptor join his crime-fighting team of "reformed" criminals, in exchange for a pardon. However, Normie bonded with the Venom symbiote, and made a bargain with Wheadon, offering his new powers in helping Wheadon's team in exchange for Raptor's release.

In an attempt to remove Spider-Girl from her friends, the new Hobgoblin, (later revealed to be the original Hobgoblin, Roderick Kingsley) savagely attacked Raptor and chained her body to a fence. In the following issue, she was taken to the hospital where she seemed to be recovering. She later marries Normie Osborn.

Damon Ryder
In his first appearance, Damon Ryder infiltrated May Parker's engagement party in Boston. He had stalked her relatives, the Reilly's, for some time in an attempt to find Ben Reilly, who he claimed burned down his house and killed his family. He found Peter Parker, whom Ben was cloned from, and attacked him, believing him to be Ben. Peter was able to fend off Raptor's attack long enough to sneak off and change into his Spider-Man costume. The two battled, and Raptor was eventually defeated. However, he managed to escape while Peter was distracted at the shock of learning about Ryder's interest in Ben Reilly.

Ryder later tracked Peter down to New York, first attacking him at the Front Line office, then going to his apartment with the intent of leaving a message for Peter with his roommate, Michelle Gonzalez. He then went to May's house, where Peter's cousins and Harry Osborn were staying, and took all the occupants hostage. When Peter arrived, Raptor threatened to kill them all unless Peter revealed his "true" identity.

Through flashbacks, it was shown that Ben Reilly once worked as lab assistant to Ryder. The two became close friends during their work searching for proof of dinosaurs being human ancestors, with Ben meeting Ryder's wife and children. However, Ben soon discovered that Ryder had experimented on himself with raptor genes in an attempt to further their research. When he confronted him, Ryder grew angry and the two argued. Damon attacked Ben, but Ben managed to restrain him, hoping to bring in a geneticist to purge his system of the mutation. Damon managed to escape in the interim, and Ben followed him to his home, where Damon revealed that he was starting to mutate, thus become more susceptible to Ben's assistance. As they talked, both were unaware that Ben's fellow clone, Kaine, was hiding just outside the house. Kaine jumped in through a window and attacked Ben, with a fire starting during the ensuing battle. It was then shown that Damon had murdered his own family, though he did not realize it, having been driven insane by his mutation, his warped mind causing him to conclude that Ben had killed his family in 'protest' against his experiments. Furious, Ben beat him unconscious, with Kaine commenting that the events that unfolded would have drastic consequences.

In the present, Kaine broke into the Parker house, revealing that he was working with Raptor, under the promise of being cured of his cellular degeneration. During the fight, he exposed Peter's identity as Spider-Man, and Ben's identity as a clone. He encouraged Raptor to kill Peter, since anything Ben would do, so would Peter. Refusing to accept this, Peter affirmed both his and Reilly's innocence, proclaiming that neither of them would ever kill anyone, and beat Raptor unconscious, just as Ben had. However, Kaine managed to take Raptor and escape before the police arrived. Raptor later told Kaine that he lied about curing him in order to gain an ally. Enraged, Kaine then breaks Raptor's neck, seemingly killing him.

Mikhail Rasputin

Mister Rasputin

Rattler

Gustav Krueger

Heath Benson

Whirlo

Henry Bingham

Ravage

Ravage 2099

Ravonna

Rawhide Kid

Raza
Raza is a fictional character who originated in the Marvel Cinematic Universe before appearing in Marvel Comics. The character, created by Mark Fergus, Hawk Ostby, Art Marcum and Matt Holloway, first appeared in Iron Man (May 2, 2008) where he was portrayed by Faran Tahir.

Film
Raza holds the distinction of being the first villain introduced in the MCU. He is the leader of the Ten Rings terrorist organization and launches an attack on a US Armed Forces convoy carrying Tony Stark. After kidnapping Stark, Raza and his team torture him until he agrees to rebuild the Jericho Missile for them. They slowly fail to realize that Stark and his fellow prisoner Ho Yinsen are actually building a suit of armor to escape and manage to do so, but not before scarring Raza's face. Raza and the Ten Rings later find remnants of Stark's Mk. I armor in the desert, but they were unable to rebuild the suit or understand its intricacies. He eventually contacted his benefactor, Obadiah Stane, who actually wanted Raza to kill Stark; Raza was unaware of who he was hired to kidnap and wanted Stark's weapons for himself. He planned on giving Stark's designs to Stane in exchange for "a gift of iron soldiers". Stane ends up betraying Raza and has all his men killed. Although not shown, it is assumed that Raza himself was also killed.

Comics
Raza made his comic book debut in The Invincible Iron Man Annual #1 (August 2010) from Matt Fraction and Carmine Di Giandomenico. He ends up fulfilling exactly the same role from the movie, retconning Stark's origin again and replacing his initial inspiration, Wong-Chu. Instead of Stane however, Raza works directly for the Mandarin who is only implied to be his leader in the films.

Razor Fist

Razorback

Reaper

Gunther Strauss

Gunther Strauss is a supervillain in the Marvel Comics universe.

The character, created by Stan Lee and Al Avison, first appeared in Captain America Comics #22 (January 1943).

Within the context of the stories, Gunther Strauss is a Nazi agent ordered by Adolf Hitler to cause a popular uprising in the United States. Acting as "the Reaper", Strauss travels to Manhattan and claims to be a religious prophet who had received an oracular vision. He exhorts people to abandon morality and to tear down the legal system and the federal government. Learning of his scheme, Bucky and Captain America pursue the Reaper into the New York City Subway, where Strauss falls on the electrified third rail and is killed.

Pantu Hurageb

Pantu Hurageb is a mutant in the X-Force comic book series. He generates a paralyzing wave that slows reaction times and also has prosthetic hands, that he can morph into a scythe. He has been a terrorist member of the Mutant Liberation Front in the main Marvel Universe but a hero in the Ultraverse.

Recorder 451

Red Barbarian

Red Dagger
Red Dagger (Kareem) is a fictional character appearing in American comic books published by Marvel Comics.  He was created by G. Willow Wilson and Mirka Andolfo and first appeared in Ms. Marvel (vol. 4) #12 (October 2016).

Kareem is a teenager from Badin who protects the streets of Karachi at night as the vigilante Red Dagger. When Kamala Khan and her family take a trip to Pakistan, she meets Kareem, who is revealed to be a family friend, and he stays with the Khan family during their vacation while studying for his university entrance exam. Red Dagger later teams up Kamala's superhero alter ego Ms. Marvel while on duty; the two are unaware of each other's secret identities.

After the Khans return to Jersey City, Kareem later joins them and attends Kamala's high school as an exchange student. Red Dagger and Ms. Marvel eventually discover each other's secret identities and share their first kiss.

Powers and abilities of Red Dagger
Red Dagger is an accomplished martial artist, acrobat and marksman, with a preference for throwing knives.

Red Dagger in other media
Red Dagger appears in the Disney+ series Ms. Marvel, portrayed by Aramis Knight. This version is a member of a group called the Red Daggers, who seek to protect Earth from the Clandestines.

Red Ghost

Red Guardian

Aleksey Lebedev

Alexei Shostakov

Dr. Tania Belinsky

Josef Petkus

Krassno Granitsky

Anton

Nicolai Krylenko

Red King
Red King (Angmo-Asan II) is a fictional character appearing in American comic books published by Marvel Comics. He was created by Greg Pak and Carlo Pagulayan for their Planet Hulk arc.

Before becoming the Father Emperor of Sakaar, Angmo-Asan II's father was an Imperial soldier-turned-warlord whose exploits united the nations of Imperia during the Wars of Empire and saved the planet from alien invasion during the Spike War. After his father died, Angmo II ascended to the throne and took the name "Red King".

Angmo as the new king was vastly different to his warrior-like father; he was vain and childlike, desired power and glory, and had no morals on how to achieve them. Before he died, Angmo's father had recognized these traits in his son and decided that Angmo II posed a threat to the planet and its people if he ever took the throne. The king sent his warbound Shadow, Hiroim the Shamed, to assassinate the prince. The only thing that saved the prince's life was Hiroim's unwillingness to kill a child.

While Angmo was still young he came across the thirteen year old Caiera whose village was attacked by the Spikes. Using her Old Power and fighting skills she fought the infected of her village until she was saved by the young Red King. The Red King had stood by and allowed her village to be infected in order to find a Shadow with the Old Power. He proceeded to enslave her. She was later freed and officially made the King's bodyguard. The Red King would go on to have almost all his sons and daughters slaughtered to ensure they could not take the throne from him.

The Red King still ruled Sakaar when the Hulk was inadvertently exiled to their world. Initially the Hulk was enslaved and trained as a gladiator to fight for the entertainment of the Emperor but he quickly began to gain attention as the Green Scar and Sakaarson, a mythical figure prophesied to rule Sakaar and heal it.

The Red King grew concerned and tried to have the Hulk killed repeatedly to no avail until they entered into open war with one another. The Hulk led his friends the Warbound and others against the Red King, eventually gaining the support of the King's own bodyguard, Caiera the Oldstrong, who turned against him when the Red King unleashed the Spikes against the Hulk.

The Hulk led his forces on Crown City and personally fought the Red King, seemingly defeating him and stopping the destruction of Crown City caused by the King. At some point after his downfall, the Red King was found by the Wildebots and reconstructed as a Cyborg, leading survivors of Crown City to safety and coming to regret his past actions, feeling that the Hulk had helped him become who he should have been. The Red King followed the Hulk's son Skaar up until the destruction of the planet. It remains unclear whether or not he survived the planet being consumed by Galactus.

Red King in other media
 The Red King appears in Planet Hulk, voiced by Mark Hildreth. Unlike the comics, Caiera infects the King with spikes as revenge before leaving him to be slaughtered by his Death's Head guards.
 The Red King appears in The Super Hero Squad Show episode "Planet Hulk! (Six Against Infinity, Part 5)".
 The Red King appears as a playable character and boss in Lego Marvel Super Heroes 2.

Red Lotus
Red Lotus (Paul Hark) is a fictional character, a mutant appearing in American comic books published by Marvel Comics. He was created by Chris Claremont and Salvador Larroca.

Red Lotus was born in Sydney, Australia, to an American parent, and is the heir apparent to the Sydney Chinese Triad, which was run by his grandfather, who was known as Father Gow. When Gow was murdered, Red Lotus was led to believe that the culprit was Gambit by the Examiner, who wanted to gain control of the Triad for himself.

Red Lotus assisted the X-Treme X-Men team against Sebastian Shaw and Lady Mastermind after the truth was revealed, and later helped them while they were trying to repel an interdimensional invasion in Madripoor.

After the invasion on Madripoor, Paul became an ally to Viper and joined her undercover at the Hellfire Club hoping to shut down their mutant slave ring. He was almost murdered by Selene, but Marvel Girl was able to save him.

He was last seen still as an ally to Courtney Ross, Viper, Sunspot and their new Hellfire Club, however, what happened to him after M-Day still remains a mystery.

Red Lotus is a superhuman martial artist who possesses enhanced strength, speed, reflexes, agility, dexterity, coordination, balance, and endurance.

Red Lotus in other media
Red Lotus was set to appear in Dark Phoenix, portrayed by Andrew Stehlin. In the final film however, he is replaced by Ariki, a mutant capable of manipulating his braids. Furthermore, a "Red Lotus Gang" was originally set to appear in earlier stages.

Red Hulk

Thunderbolt Ross

Robert Maverick

Red Nine

Red Raven

Red Ronin

Red She-Hulk

Red Shift

Red Skull

Johann Schmidt

George John Maxon

Albert Malik

Sinthea Schmidt

Johann Schmidt (Clone)

Red Sonja

Red Wolf

Wildrun

Johnny Wakely

Thomas Thunderhead

William Talltrees

Redstone

Redwing

Redeemer
Redeemer is codename used by two minor characters in Marvel Comics. Both are acquaintances of the Hulk.

Craig Saunders
Craig Saunders Jr., created by John Byrne, first appeared in The Incredible Hulk (vol. 2) #317 (March 1986). Fascinated by explosives every since childhood, he specialized in explosive ordinance disposal until he was too late with a mother and daughter killed by the bomb blast to which his military reputation had been permanently damaged as a result of bad press. Saunders is recruited into the Hulkbusters by Bruce Banner, vowing to redeem himself of his failings by doggedly hunting the Hulk and gaining a friendship with teammate Sam LaRoquette. After Bruce Banner re-merged with the Hulk due to separation causing cellular degeneration, Saunders hunted Rick Jones. The Hulkbusters are recruited by S.H.I.E.L.D. as an advisor alongside LaRoquette but were manipulated by the Leader into being a brainwashed pawn with himself and LaRoquette as Redeemer and Rock respectively. He is killed when the Hulk threw him on rock spikes.

Reginald Fortean
Reginald Fortean, created by Jeff Parker and Gabriel Hardman, first appeared in Hulk (vol. 2) #30.1 (May 2011). A US Air Force General and Thunderbolt Ross's protégé, he seeks revenge on the Red Hulk (unaware that Red Hulk and Ross are one person) by using his own Redeemer armor. During one of these outings, he briefly fought Omegex.

Reginald Fortean has since taken command of the anti-Hulk "Shadow Base" black ops as part of the U.S. Hulk Operations. He uses the organization to find a way to weaponize the gamma radiation. Reginald and Dr. Charlene McGowan later graft the tissue samples of Abomination to Rick Jones' corpse as part of a gamma experiment that revives him as an Abomination/A-Bomb-like creature with two faces and many finger-like structures surrounding his face that Dr. Charlene McGowan calls Subject B. After killing a depowered Walter Langkowski, Reginald accidentally fused himself with Rick Jones's Subject B husk, turning himself into the new Subject B. Hulk and Subject B ended up killing themselves and were transported to the Below-Place. After talking to Doc Samson, Banner as Grey Hulk killed Reginald.

Regent
Regent is a character in Marvel Comics. He makes his first full appearance as the main antagonist of the limited series Amazing Spider-Man: Renew Your Vows, as part of the 2015 Secret Wars storyline. The Earth-616 version later makes a reappearance at the end of The Amazing Spider-Man (vol. 4) #1.

Earth-18119 version
During the "Secret Wars" storyline, heroes from all over the Battleworld domain of the Regency have gone missing. With the X-Men missing, the Avengers suspect that Augustus Roman is behind this. As Spider-Man hears of this, Hawkeye mentions about a mass-breakout at Ryker's Island. While the Avengers head out to fight Regent, Spider-Man heads home to meet with his wife Mary Jane Watson where he finds his daughter Annie in the clutches of Venom. With all the superheroes defeated by Regent, Peter Parker retires as Spider-Man to keep his family safe.

In light of Regent's victory, Peter Parker obtains inhibitor bracelets so that Regent won't detect him or Annie. When Annie's inhibitor bracelet breaks down before school, she must keep her abilities in check. At Regent's headquarters, Regent figures out that Spider-Man has been sighted and unleashes his Sinister Six (consisting of Doctor Octopus, Hobgoblin, Kraven the Hunter, Mysterio, Shocker, and Vulture) to hunt down Spider-Man.

Regent broadcasts that he will be doing a compulsory screening at Public School 122 Mamie Fay. Though Peter, Mary Jane, and Annie pass the scans, another kid didn't causing Peter Parker to turn into Spider-Man to defend him.

As S.H.I.E.L.D. faces the Regent, Mary Jane and Annie confront his scientists led by Dr. Shannon Stillwell. Using the same type of armor as the Regent, Mary Jane helps Annie to disable the mechanism that held the captive heroes in order for Regent to draw in their powers. When this attracts the attention of Regent, Spider-Man escapes and takes the fight with Regent to the streets. Annie joined the fight and used the special arrowhead on Regent. Despite this, Regent is still a threat as he grabs Annie. Spider-Man uses a bluff to get close to Regent so that he can defeat him. Using an improvised restraining unit made by Prowler, S.H.I.E.L.D took Regent into their custody as Spider-Man and his family resume their normal lives.

Earth-616 version
On Earth-616, Augustus Roman is the CEO of Empire Unlimited. However, he secretly adopted the identity of Regent wearing a silver armor that changes his appearance to an armored one. Roman had felt abhorrence towards super-humans ever since his family died during a conflict between the Avengers and the Masters of Evil, were he made a cameo appearance in Avengers #277. Believing that super-humans, and their powers and abilities, including their weapons should be contained and controlled, Roman created a prison known as The Cellar, located in Ryker's Island. On the surface, The Cellar appeared to be nothing more than a holding facility, when in reality its super-powered inmates were restrained inhumanly, and had their powers replicated into a special suit designed for Roman, and now referring himself as Regent, the "savior of humanity".

Harry Lyman soon finds out Augustus' true identity as Regent, while learning his action for sudden disappearance of the super-humans alike. Even much more worst situation as Betty Brant, sent by Harry attempt to go to Augustus to ask him if he's actually a Regent, Augustus kidnaps Betty to cover his identity and his ruthless action from being exposed, so will the rest of the innocent people who may stumbled finds out his schemes. As Harry tries to expose Augustus' secret identity as a Regent for a disappearing of Betty, right before Regent captures him, Harry manage to call the original Spider-Man, as well as Iron Man that he finally finds out Augustus is Regent. Mary Jane soon catch up with Spider-Man and Iron Man, donning Peter's old Iron Spider suit to catch with them and rescues other missing super humans from Regent. As Spider-Man manage to find Harry and releases other captured super humans, and destroys the machine that powers Regent, Regent becomes powerless, surrounded by the other heroes and innocence he captured, and finally being arrested and put to justice, imprisoned in his own Cellar he created.

During the "Secret Empire" storyline, Regent appears as a member of Hydra's Army of Evil. He partakes in the attacks on New York in retribution on what happened at Pleasant Hill.

Regent in other media
The Augustus Roman incarnation of Regent appears in Spider-Man, voiced by Imari Williams. This version is the warden of a supervillain prison called the Cellar and Police Chief Yuri Watanabe's mentor who holds a grudge against the Avengers for arresting his father, who was given a life sentence for what Roman saw as minor felonies. As Regent, he wears a special suit capable of mimicking the powers of the Cellar's inmates: Cloak, Dagger, Electro, Mister Negative, Molten Man, Sandgirl, the Spot, Frostbite, Whirlwind, and Paradox. In the episode "Brand New Day", Regent banishes the Avengers and Spider-Man to another dimension. However, by the following episode "The Cellar", Spider-Man, Doctor Octopus, and Anna Maria Marconi free Cloak and Dagger, who bring back the Avengers. They and Spider-Man defeat Regent, who is relieved of his position as warden and remanded to the Cellar.

Reignfire

Ben Reilly

May Reilly

Replica 
Replica is a Skrull from an alternate future and a member of the Guardians of the Galaxy and Galactic Guardians.The character, created by Jim Valentino, first appeared in Guardians of the Galaxy #9 (February 1991) as an inhabitant of the alternate timeline/reality Marvel Comics designated as Earth-691. Within the context of the stories, Replica is a devout member of the Universal Church of Truth who lives in disguise on the planet New Haven under the rule of Rancor. When the Guardians of the Galaxy arrive, she joins them and the Resistance against Rancor. When the Guardians leave New Haven, she stows away on their ship as an insect only to be discovered by Yondu. Over time she assists the Guardians against a Stark saboteur, the Spirit of Vengeance, and the Grand Inquisitor. She also reveals that she is a member of the Universal Church of Truth and a Skrull as she officially joins the Guardians. Later, in order to save the lives of the Guardians, she gives herself as a playmate to her god, Protégé.

Reptil

Reptyl

Clive Reston

Rev

Revanche

Revolutionary
Revolutionary is a fictional character appearing in Avengers: The Initiative Annual #1 created by Dan Slott, Christos N. Gage, and Patrick Scherberger.

The Revolutionary was a Skrull secret agent, sent as part of a Skrull plan to conquer the Earth. The Revolutionary infiltrated the Liberteens, a superhero team based in Philadelphia who were the official government-approved superteam for the state of Pennsylvania. The Revolutionary was in contact with Criti Noll, the Skrull posing as Yellowjacket, speaking from Camp Hammond. He was a level-headed and respectful in his role as leader of the group.

When 3-D Man (Delroy Garrett Jr.) began his cross country effort with the Skrull Kill Krew to rid the Initiative of Skrull infiltrators, the Revolutionary was one of the Skrulls defeated. Gravity dropped the diamond-skinned Hope on top of the Revolutionary and dramatically amplified her mass, crushing him to a bloody pulp.

The real Revolutionary later attended a support group meeting at Camp Hammond for the S.H.I.E.L.D. agents and heroes who were replaced.

Cecilia Reyes

Gabe Reyes

Gabriel "Gabe" Reyes is a fictional character in Marvel Comics. The character, created by Felipe Smith and Tradd Smith, first appeared in All-New Ghost Rider #1 (May 2014).

Gabe Reyes is the younger brother of Robbie Reyes the new Ghost Rider. When his mother was pregnant with him, their uncle Eli Morrow shoved her down the stairs, resulting in Gabe being born with limited motor control over his legs. Gabe is also developmentally disabled and is need of constant attention from Robbie. Gabe looks up to his brother, but under the influence of Eli, the two begin to drift away from each other to the point that they begin fighting. Eli takes over Gabe and begins to go after his former boss, Yegor Ivanov. Robbie rescues Gabe by taking Eli back and killing Ivanov, the brothers' faith in each other is restored.

Gabe Reyes in other media
Gabe Reyes appears in Agents of S.H.I.E.L.D. portrayed by Lorenzo James Henrie. This version is a high school student who became wheelchair-bound following an attack by a street gang called the Fifth Street Locos and is initially unaware of Robbie's activities as the Ghost Rider until Robbie tells him the truth about the night that they were attacked.

Rhapsody

Rhino

Lila Rhodes
Lila Rhodes is a fictional character appearing in Marvel Comics. The character first appeared in Iron Patriot #1 (March 2014), and was created by Ales Kot and Garry Brown. She is the niece of James Rhodes and the daughter of Jeanette Rhodes. Lila provides tech support.

Roberta Rhodes
Roberta Rhodes is a fictional character appearing in Marvel Comics. The character first appeared in Iron Man #173 (May 1973), and was created by Denny O'Neil and Luke McDonnell. She is the mother of James Rhodes / War Machine. Roberta is shown to supportive of her son.

Roberta Rhodes in other media
Roberta Rhodes appears in Iron Man: Armored Adventures, voiced by Catherine Haggquist. This version is the legal guardian and attorney for Tony Stark after his father's disappearance.

Terrence Rhodes
Terrence Rhodes is a fictional character appearing in Marvel Comics. The character, created by Dan Abnett and Dave Chlystek, first appeared in War Machine #12 (January 1995) but his name is officially revealed in Iron Patriot #1 (March 2014). He is the father of James Rhodes / War Machine and Jeanette Rhodes, and the grandfather of Lila Rhodes. Rhodes provided support for his family. As the Iron Patriot, he tries to stop a conspiracy to which he sacrifices himself.

Terrence Rhodes in other media
 Terrence Rhodes / Iron Patriot appears as an assist character in Disney Infinity 2.0.

Val Rhymin

Zander Rice

Dr. Zander Rice is a fictional character in the Marvel Universe. He was created by Craig Kyle, Christopher Yost and Billy Tan, and his first appearance was in X-23 #1 (March 2005). His father Dale Rice worked on the Weapon X Program and was killed by Wolverine. Years later, Rice works on recreating the Weapon X experiment with his mentor Dr. Martin Sutter. He was eventually paired with Dr. Sarah Kinney, whom he did not get along with. When Sarah suggested making a female clone for Wolverine, Rice reluctantly agreed. Although Zander forced Sarah to carry the embryo to term, Rice proceeded to mistreat and abuse Laura Kinney who he called "Pet" and "Animal" following birth. Rice uses Laura's trigger scent to kill Sutter so that he can be in charge of the program and create more clones to sell on the market. Laura is later ordered by Sarah to kill Rice and destroy the facility. Laura gets back at Rice by calling him "Animal" upon his death. In a cruel twist of fate, Rice hid a trigger scent in Sarah's hair and Sarah too is murdered by Laura.

Zander Rice in other media
Zander Rice appears in Logan, portrayed by Richard E. Grant. This version is the head of the corporation Alkali-Transigen who created the Transigen virus to sterilize mutantkind, which also caused the decay of Logan's healing factor and Charles Xavier's mental deterioration, in an attempt to make his own mutants as his Reavers were not as effective as he had hoped. After several mutant children escape from Transigen, Rice and the Reavers pursue Logan to get them back, only to be killed by him.

Franklin Richards

Gail Richards
Gail Richards is a character who originated in the film serial Captain America (Feb. 5, 1944), later appearing in the Ultimate Marvel universe. The character, created by Royal Cole; Harry Fraser; Joseph Poland; Ronald Davidson; Basil Dickey; Jesse Duffy and Grant Nelson, was portrayed by Lorna Gray.

Gail Richards in film
Gail Richards is the secretary to D.A. Grant Gardner, the serial's version of Captain America. Gail was well aware of Grant's double identity and would usually try to cover while Grant was off fighting crime and would contact to update on certain information. While Gail was the typical damsel in distress seen in films at the time, she did display a bit of a backbone every now and then and at one point managed to get the drop on some criminals. It was implied that she had feelings for Grant though this was never explored.

Gail Richards in comics
A character loosely based on her, also named Gail Richards, appeared in the Ultimate Marvel Universe. This character was created by Mark Millar and Bryan Hitch, and first appeared in The Ultimates #1. She was the fiancée of Captain America (Steve Rogers) before the man's supposed demise. She eventually becomes Bucky Barnes's wife to which the two have a family. In the early 21st century, Gail was shocked to learned of Steve's survival and youthful preservation, and emotionally refused to be reunited. However, they later rekindle a friendship. Unbeknownst to Rogers, Gail had conceived Captain America's son, and was "convinced" by the American government to give up their child to the military's supposed safety. In reality, the government trained her son to be the next super soldier who instead chose to be the Ultimate iteration of Red Skull. She is later given a chance to say goodbye to her son.

Gail Richards in other media
Gail Richards makes minor appearances in Ultimate Avengers and Ultimate Avengers 2, voiced by an unidentified actress.

Nathaniel Richards

Valeria Richards

Molly von Richthofen

Ricochet

Peter Parker

Johnny Gallo

Rictor

Right-Winger

Right-Winger (Jerry Johnson) is a veteran and superhero in the Marvel Comics universe.

The character, created by Mark Gruenwald and Paul Neary, first appeared in Captain America #323 (November 1986).

Within the context of the stories, Jerry Johnson was born in Philadelphia, Pennsylvania. He was a veteran who had served 4 years in the U.S. Army with his friend, John Walker. Both became disillusioned and grew bored due to the lack of action during peace-time service. They both signed up for the Power Broker's strength augmentation process, and joined the Unlimited Class Wrestling Federation. Later, John Walker approached him to form a team of superhumans, known as the B.U.C.s (Bold Urban Commandos) or "Buckies". This team consisted of Johnson, Lemar Hoskins, and Hector Lennox, and they all wore variations of Captain America's costume.

Walker, now known as the Super-Patriot publicly spoke out against the original Captain America, and the Buckies pretended to be Cap's supporters. The Buckies staged opposition to Walker and pretended to attack him at a rally in Central Park as a publicity stunt. Walker defeated these protesters and proclaimed to Captain America that the people should decide who was worthy of being Captain America. Eventually, the Commission on Superhuman Activities selected Walker to replace Steve Rogers as Captain America, and chose Lemar Hoskins to become his partner Bucky (and later as Battlestar).

Lennox and Johnson were left behind, feeling betrayed and angered. They chose the names Left-Winger and Right-Winger respectively. They wore stolen Guardsmen armor and battled Walker and Hoskins. The pair upstaged the new Captain America at a patriotic rally and press conference, attacking him and revealing Walker's identity to the press out of jealousy over his new-found success. As a result, Walker's parents were killed by the militia group The Watchdogs, nearly driving Walker into a mental breakdown. Walker blamed his former partners for his parents' deaths, and he stalked them. When he caught up to Left-Winger and Right-Winger, he tied them to an oil tank which was detonated by a torch-saber and left them to die. They barely survived the explosion due to their bodies' enhanced physiology, leaving them terribly burned and in critical condition.

Later, Walker became the U.S. Agent and joined the West Coast Avengers. Left-Winger and Right-Winger, alongside several others, were plucked from different time periods by Immortus to serve in the third Legion of the Unliving. They battled U.S. Agent, who slew them again not believing them to be authentic.

Eventually, it was revealed to Walker that the pair had survived the explosion and were hospitalized in Houston. After undergoing painful treatment for the burns they received, they had committed suicide. When Walker learned of this, he was remorseful.

Ringer

Anthony Davis

Keith Kraft

Unnamed

Ringmaster

Fritz Tiboldt

Ringo Kid

Rintrah
Rintrah is an other-dimensional mystic. The character, created by Peter B. Gillis and Chris Warner, first appeared in Doctor Strange #80 (Dec. 1986). He was depicted as a green furred minotaur. Within the context of the stories, Rintrah comes from an other-dimensional planet called R'Vaal. There, because of his sensitivity to occult forces and his potential to become a skilled sorcerer, he is an apprentice to Enitharmon the Weaver. When Doctor Strange brings his Cloak of Levitation to Enitharmon for repair, the weaver sends Rintrah to return the restored cloak. After delivering the cloak, Strange briefly, and with permission, possesses his body to fend off Urthona. He remains with Strange for a short time before returning to his apprenticeship.

Rintrah in other media
Rintrah appears in the Marvel Cinematic Universe (MCU) film Doctor Strange in the Multiverse of Madness (2022), voiced by Adam Hugill. This version is a member of the Masters of the Mystic Arts.
Rintrah appears as a playable character in Marvel Contest of Champions.

Dallas Riordan

Riot
Riot is the name used by a symbiote in Marvel Comics. The symbiote, created by David Michelinie and Ron Lim, first appeared in Venom: Lethal Protector #4 (May 1993) and was named in Carnage, U.S.A. #2 (March 2012) after an unrelated purplish-black, four-armed action figure from the Planet of the Symbiotes storyline. It was created as one of five symbiote "children" forcefully spawned from the Venom symbiote along with Lasher, Agony, Phage, and Scream. Riot primarily sports symbiote hammers and maces.

Riot's first host is Trevor Cole, a mercenary hired by Carlton Drake's Life Foundation in San Francisco. Cole is one of several employees to be bonded with a symbiote, along with Donna Diego (Scream), Leslie Gesneria (Agony), Carl Mach (Phage), and Ramon Hernandez (Lasher). Riot and his "siblings" are defeated by Spider-Man and Eddie Brock. The symbiotes' hosts kidnap Brock in an attempt to communicate with their symbiotes. When Brock refuses to aid them, Cole is killed along with Gesneria and Mach. The others initially believe that Brock was picking the group off, but the killer is later revealed to be Diego, having developed schizophrenia from Scream's influence.

Riot's second host is Howard Ogden, a Petty Officer assigned to the Mercury Team alongside Phage (Rico Axelson), Lasher (Marcus Simms), and Agony (James Murphy). With Cletus Kasady on the loose in Colorado, Ogden and the Team Mercury assist Spider-Man, Scorn and Flash Thompson. Nevertheless, Riot and his teammates are killed by Carnage in their secret base, and the four symbiotes bond with the Mercury Team's dog after the fight.

After being possessed by Knull, Riot and his "siblings" take over a family, with him and Agony taking the father and mother respectively while Phage and Lasher bond to the children before the group head to New York to help in Carnage's quest. They hunt Dylan Brock and Normie Osborn, but are defeated and separated from their hosts by the Maker. Under Knull's possession, Phage merges with his "siblings" into one, but is defeated by Andi Benton. 

Riot's fourth host calls himself Mr. Riot while taking part in a conspiracy led by the Carnage symbiote. Riot assists the other three symbiote enforcers and Carnage until they are defeated by  Thompson, Silence, and Toxin and contained in Alchemax's custody.

Riot in other media
 The Trevor Cole incarnation of Riot appears as a boss in Spider-Man and Venom: Separation Anxiety.
 The Trevor Cole incarnation of Riot appears as a playable character in Spider-Man Unlimited.
 The Riot symbiote appears in Venom, with various hosts portrayed by Michelle Lee, Vickie Eng and Zeva DuVall. An amalgamation of its comic counterpart and Phage, this version is the leader of a symbiote infiltration squad. Riot escapes the Life Foundation's first spaceship, going through multiple hosts before arriving in San Francisco and bonding with Carlton Drake (portrayed by Riz Ahmed) in an attempt to bring more symbiotes to Earth. Riot faces and overpowers Venom in battle then escapes into the Life Foundation's second rocket, but Venom damages it, killing Riot and Drake.

Riptide

Deborah Risman

Matthew Risman

Risque

Donald & Deborah Ritter

Roberta

Roberta is a fictional android in Marvel Comics. The character, created by John Byrne, first appeared in Fantastic Four #239 (February 1982).

Roberta was created by Reed Richards when he realized that no one would apply to work as the Fantastic Four's receptionist. She is known for her calm demeanor in the face of unusual situations and resembles a blonde haired woman with glasses down to the waist, where the rest of her is a machine connected to a desk. She has dealt with the Thing, Black Cat, Kitty Pryde and John Byrne. She once took down the Trapster in one blow. When Kristoff Vernard blew up the Baxter Building, he also destroyed Roberta.

When the Baxter Building was rebuilt, so was Roberta with her memories intact. She showed some slight confusion over the sight of seeing Doctor Doom with Alicia Masters and for once was unsure of what to do. She was ripped from her circuits by Mad Thinker when his mind was trapped in the body of the Awesome Android. Reed was able to rebuild her, however. She once again showed minor interest in the strange going ons around her. She witnessed Luke Cage drive his car through the Baxter Building and then witnessed him fight the Thing. Scott Lang has deduced that Roberta is incapable of sarcasm as she cheerfully told Alicia "you're welcome" after it was apparent that her thanks was sarcastic. She also prefers to call herself a "mechanized human".

Roberta received a redesign when the Four Freedoms Plaza was donated to the Thunderbolts. While the original design still had blonde hair and wore glasses, the Four Freedoms Plaza version had black hair while the Thunderbolts Plaza version had long brown hair. Roberta got another redesign, this time she had a full, silvery humanoid body and was first seen meeting with new Fantastic Four writer Roberto Aguirre-Sacasa. She has since started dating former killer robot turned assistant mail man Elektro and the two have since started living together.

Roberta in other media
Roberta appears in Fantastic Four: Rise of the Silver Surfer played by Patricia Harras. She is only credited as Fan Four Receptionist even though she is referred to as Roberta within the film. This version is a hologram who greets General Hager who is looking for Reed only to be deactivated by Susan Storm.

Robbie Robertson

Randy Robertson

Rock Python

Rocket Raccoon

Rocket Racer

Robert Farrell

Henry Sleeman

Rocketeers

Rocketlauncher

Rockman

Rockslide

Barbara Rodriguez
Barbara Rodriguez is a minor character appearing within Marvel Comics. The character, created by Brian Michael Bendis and Sara Pichelli, first appeared in Spider-Men #1 (July 2017). She is Miles Morales's "first serious girlfriend".

Rodstvow

Joseph Rogers
Joseph Rogers is a minor character in Marvel Comics. He is the father of Steve Rogers. The character, created by Rick Remender and John Romita Jr., first appeared in Captain America (vol. 7) #1 (January 2013). Born and raised in Ireland, Joseph took a bullet during World War I. He later married Sarah and the two emigrated to the United States. Sometime after his son's birth, Joseph could not find any work and turned into an alcoholic, abusing Steve and Sarah. He later died of influenza.

Joseph Rogers in other media
The character has a non-voiced cameo appearance in Avengers Assemble episode "The House of Zemo".

Sarah Rogers
Sarah Rogers is a minor character in Marvel Comics. She is the mother of Steve Rogers. The character, created by Roger Stern and John Byrne, first appeared in Captain America #255 (March 1981). Born and raised in Ireland, she married Joseph Rogers and the two immigrated to the United States. After she gave birth to their son, Sarah raised Steve to the best of her ability in New York City despite Joseph being an alcoholic and abusive. After Joseph's death, Sarah worked double shifts at a garment factory and took in laundry to help ends meet and support Steve, and died some years later of illness.

Other versions of Sarah Rogers
Steve Rogers's alternate reality daughter is presumably named after Sarah Rogers.

Steven Rogers
Steven Rogers Jr. is a character appearing in Marvel Comics. The character was created by Rick Margopoulos and Dan Reed, and first appeared in What If? #38 (January 1983). He is the son of Steve Rogers / Captain America and Sharon Carter.

Alternate versions of Steven Rogers
An alternate Ultimate Marvel equivalent of the Red Skull is the secret son of Captain America and Gail Richards. This character was created by Mark Millar and Carlos Pacheco, and first appeared in Ultimate Comics: Avengers #1 (October 2009). This version wears simple khaki pants and a white tee shirt. After World War II, he is taken from Richards and raised on an army base where he appears to be a well-adjusted, physically superior and tactically brilliant young man. However, his easygoing personality was a ruse as he kills over 200 men and then cuts off his face which leaves a "red skull" for his likeness, and had a long career of working as a professional assassin. Eventually, Rogers joins A.I.M. so that he can steal the Cosmic Cube's blueprints, meeting Captain America and revealing his true identity. Rogers later takes control of the Cosmic Cube where he has a sadistic display of nearly unlimited power when confronting the Avengers led by Nick Fury (who is implied to have Rogers out of retirement) and Gregory Stark; he actually wanted to use the Cosmic Cube to manipulate time to have his family together with a normal life. Rogers is defeated when his father arrives in a stolen fighter jet which teleports to Hawkeye's exact coordinates. In a hospital, Rogers is kept alive long enough for his mother's goodbyes before he is killed by Petra Laskov.

The 2017 Secret Wars storyline features Ellie Rogers, the daughter of Steve Rogers and Sharon Carter in the Battleworld domain of the Hydra Empire. She is part of the Resistance which are killed by a group of female assassins while she's infected by Venom and later turned into the symbiote-powered Viper, but uses these abilities to help Nomad.

Steven Rogers in other media
 A character named James Rogers appears in Next Avengers: Heroes of Tomorrow (2008), voiced by Noah Crawford. This version is the son of Captain America and Black Widow.
 A variation of Steven Rogers named Sharon Rogers appears as a playable character in the video game Marvel: Future Fight. As part of Captain America's 75th anniversary, she is the daughter of Steve Rogers and Peggy Carter from an alternate timeline where she now serves as Captain America.

Rogue

Rom

Roma

Romulus

Ronan the Accuser

Ronin

Maya Lopez

Clint Barton

Alexei Shostakov

Eric Brooks

Richard Rory

Bernie Rosenthal 

Bernadette "Bernie" Rosenthal is an artisan, lawyer, and romantic interest of Captain America. The character, created by Roger Stern and John Byrne, first appeared in Captain America #247 (July 1980).

Within the context of the stories, Bernie Rosenthal is a glass blower, wrestling fanatic and studying lawyer. After moving into her friend's apartment building, she met Steve Rogers who secretly was the patriotic superhero Captain America. The two immediately hit it off, but Bernie was surprised by Steve's sudden exit, something which her friends said was totally normal of him. Bernie further sympathized with Steve after seeing a photo of his former girlfriend Sharon Carter who at the time was believed to have died. She also pretended to play hard to get for Steve with her admitting to herself that she was being childish. She was unaware that she was falling for him. After a couple of misfire dates that caused both Bernie and Steve to question their relationship, they assured each other they were in love.

While at an Anti-Nazi rally, Bernie ran into her ex-husband Sammy Bernstein. Bernie tried to reconnect with her ex, but was appalled at his violent behavior. Steve stepped away to become Captain America and when the violence was halted and Sammy taken away, Bernie came to the sudden realization that Steve and Captain America were one and the same. After avoiding each other for the day the two spoke and Bernie accepted Steve's double life. From that point on, Bernie became another love interest who patiently waited for her hero to return. Eventually Bernie proposed to Steve. Due to an increase in rent, Bernie had to close her store, 'The Glass Menagerie'. She decided to pursue her interest in law and applied for various colleges. After some worry she was accepted in University of Wisconsin–Madison. Bernie took off for college, leaving a note behind for Steve, as she felt he had a lot on his mind. She continued to collect newspaper clippings of Captain America, until he came to visit and internally admitted that she no longer wished to be engaged to him.

Eventually, Bernie graduated summa cum laude and had since moved on from Steve. Nevertheless, she continued to rely on him for future conflicts, or whenever she needed a friend. She later met up with Steve's then current girlfriend, Rachel Leighton, and even though there was slight animosity toward each other, with Bernie slightly having her feelings reignited for Steve, the two became friends. Bernie then got a job as a junior partner at the law firm of Sullivan and Krakower. Bernie continued to update herself on Captain America's exploits and even defended Bucky Barnes from Doctor Faustus.

Bernie Rosenthal in other media
A similar character named Bernice Stewart and nicknamed 'Bernie' appears in the 1990 film adaptation of Captain America, portrayed by Kim Gillingham. This version is slightly combined with Peggy Carter as Steve Rogers's fiancé in the 1940s. Sixteen years after Steve is lost in the Antarctic, Bernie moved on and married another man, since she had the wish to have children, and indeed had a daughter named Sharon, portrayed by the same actress. Steve wakes up in present-day and reunites with Bernie, but their happy reunion doesn't last long as the Red Skull's men arrive, kill Bernie and wound her husband.

Roughouse

Roulette
Roulette (real name: Jennifer Stavros) is a fictional character, a mutant appearing in American comic books published by Marvel Comics.

Donald Roxxon
Donald Phillip Roxxon is a fictional supporting character in the Ultimate Marvel universe, which is separate from the "mainstream" Marvel Comics continuity. The character, created by Brian Michael Bendis and Mark Bagley, first appeared in Ultimate Spider-Man #86 (January 2006).

The inept CEO of a pharmaceutical company, he gets attacked by various supervillains (hired by the Tinkerer) so he hires bodyguards, but is saved by the original Spider-Man. Roxxon is later revealed to have been in possession of the Venom symbiote which gets stolen by biochemist Conrad Markus, and is the benefactor of the Roxxon Brain Trust and the Prowler. Roxxon is personally defeated by a group of amateur superheroes led by the second Spider-Man and arrested by Spider-Woman.

Royal Roy

Ruby Thursday

Ruckus

Runner

Henry Russo

The Russian

Ryder

John Ryker

Rynda

Queen Rynda is a member of the race known as the Inhumans in the Marvel Universe. The character, created by Stan Lee and Jack Kirby, first appeared in Thor #148 (January 1968).

The wife of King Agon, Rynda ruled the Inhumans alongside her husband whom she was devoted to. Her Inhuman ability allowed her to be immune to poisons. While pregnant with her son Black Bolt, Agon exposed her to the Terrigen Mists resulting in Black Bolt being born with immense powers. Due to her immunity, Rynda was able to resist going through second Terrigensis. She was killed alongside her husband by the Kree.

Rynda in other media
Rynda appeared in the 2017 Marvel Cinematic Universe television series Inhumans played by Tanya Clarke. She and her husband Agon were unintentionally killed by Black Bolt.

References

Marvel Comics characters: R, List of